Yahoo! Gallery was a service from Yahoo! that provided applications using Yahoo! technologies. It was shut down on July 14, 2009.  The site now redirects to Yahoo! Pulse.

External links
 Yahoo! Gallery

Gallery